A test drive is a trial use of a motor vehicle.

Test Drive may also refer to:
Test Drive, a series of racing video games
Test Drive (1987 video game), the first game in the series
Test Drive (2002 video game) 
Test Drive (EP), 2011 EP by Jin Akanishi
"Test Drive", a 2018 song by Joji from Ballads 1
"Test Drive", a 2021 song by Ariana Grande from the deluxe edition of Positions
Pepsi Max & Jeff Gordon Present: Test Drive, a 2013 American short film

See also 
 Driving test